Anna Komnene Angelina or Comnena Angelina (c. 1176 – 1212) was an Empress of Nicaea. She was the daughter of the Byzantine Emperor Alexios III Angelos and of Euphrosyne Doukaina Kamatera.

Life
Her first marriage was to the sebastokratōr Isaac Komnenos Vatatzes, a great-nephew of the emperor Manuel I Komnenos. They had one daughter, Theodora Angelina. Soon after Anna's father became emperor, in 1195, Isaac Komnenos was dispatched to combat the Vlach-Bulgarian Rebellion. He was captured, became a pawn between rival Bulgarian and Vlach factions, and died in chains.

Her second marriage to Theodore Laskaris, eventually emperor of Nicaea, was celebrated in a double wedding in early 1200 (the other couple was Anna's sister Irene and Alexios Palaiologos).

Issue
Anna and Isaac had one daughter:
 Theodora Angelina, betrothed to Ivanko of Bulgaria, Dobromir Chrysos, and finally Leopold VI, Duke of Austria.

Anna and Theodore had three daughters and two short-lived sons:
 Nicholas Laskaris (died c. 1212)
 John Laskaris (died c. 1212)
 Irene Doukaina Komnene Laskarina, who married first the general Andronikos Palaiologos and then John III Doukas Vatatzes
 Maria Laskarina, who married King Béla IV of Hungary
 Eudokia Laskarina (born between 1210 and 1212, died between 1247 and 1253), engaged to Robert de Courtenay, married firstly and divorced Frederick II, Duke of Austria, secondly (bef. 1230) Anseau de Cayeux, Governor of Asia Minor

Sources
 
 , pages 259, 274, and 280.
 
 

1170s births
1212 deaths
Year of birth uncertain
Angelid dynasty
Laskarid dynasty
12th-century Byzantine women
13th-century Byzantine empresses
Empresses of Nicaea
Daughters of Byzantine emperors